STAT: Standing Tall and Talented is a series of children's books written by NBA basketball player Amar'e Stoudemire. The books are partially autobiographical and tell the story of an 11-year-old Amar'e who discovers his innate talent and has to overcome many obstacles to become the success he is today.

The books are all targeted for children aged 8+. When asked why he chose to tell his stories through novels targeted at children, Amar'e said "I decided to write for children because although I am an avid reader now, I wish I had read more as a child. I hope that together with Scholastic, we can creatively inspire a new generation to read."

Home Court (2012)
Amar'e and his friends have been playing in the same court for a long time until Carlos and his friends, Yeti and Ledge, take over. The bullies keep beating Amar'e, Deuce, and Mike badly and even trashing his dad's lawn care business. Amar'e learns to overcome and manages to teach Carlos and his gang a lesson."Some people who get kicked around want to find a place to hide. Some people who get kicked want to find something to kick." This book was dedicated to Amar'e's children and brother.

Double Team (2012)
Amar'e's team (Deuce and Mike, also his friends) keep winning series of games just because of Amar'e. But soon his friends get jealous at him for "hogging" the ball, especially Deuce. To make "even", Deuce and Mike don't get a sandwich for Amar'e during lunchtime, starving him. They also make sure Amar'e gets the ball once or never. Amar'e's team ends up winning 2 and losing the other half. Overtime, a famous ball player gives Amar'e an invitation to play in another game, labeled the same date Amar'e and his friends have to play their own! He mindlessly agreed, forgetting his original team. When he finally figures out, he tells Deuce and Mike, and they get jealous. Can Amar'e juggle this situation and set things right again?

Slam Dunk (2013)
Eleven-year-old Amar'e has been playing good basketball lately, but other people are mad at Amare because he can't dunk so he gets his friends and  puts his playing time to practice to be able to dunk.
Mustafa Ismail also tries to, and he does at the end of the book after all his hard work.

Schooled (2013)
Eleven-year-old Amar'e Stoudemire has had a lot of success playing in tournaments and street ball. But now it's time to try out for his school's team. Amar'e is good enough to play with the older kids, and should probably be a starter. But the players that have been there the longest, generally get the most playing time. Amar'e must deal with helping his team in a different way than he's used to.

Most Valuable (2014)
Amar'e's idol, Overtime Tanner plans the biggest streetball tournament every year. But when Overtime gets hurt during a basketball game, he can't make the arrangements in time. Amar'e and his friends help set the tournament up. On top of that, each group of Amar'e's' friends wants him to play for their team and he's torn on what to do.

References

External links
STAT: Standing Tall and Talented at Fantastic Fiction

Series of children's books
American children's novels
American sports novels